René Benguerel (born 11 May 1973) is a Swiss rower. He competed in the men's quadruple sculls event at the 1996 Summer Olympics.

References

1973 births
Living people
Swiss male rowers
Olympic rowers of Switzerland
Rowers at the 1996 Summer Olympics
Place of birth missing (living people)